Guanqiu Jian (died 16 March 255), courtesy name Zhonggong, was a Chinese military general and politician of the state of Cao Wei during the Three Kingdoms period of China.

Life

Guanqiu Jian was from Wenxi County, Hedong Commandery, which is present-day Wenxi County, Shanxi. His father, Guanqiu Xing, served as the Administrator of Wuwei Commandery under the Cao Wei state and held the peerage "Marquis of Gaoyang District". After his father's death, Guanqiu Jian inherited his father's peerage and served as a clerk to the Marquis of Pingyuan.

In 226, after Cao Rui, the second emperor of Wei, ascended the throne, he appointed Guanqiu Jian as a Gentleman of Writing and supervisor of the Imperial Guards. As Guanqiu Jian was previously an assistant official serving under Cao Rui when the latter was still crown prince, Cao Rui treated him exceptionally well. Guanqiu Jian later rose to the position of Agricultural Officer of Luoyang. During this time, he wrote to Cao Rui, advising the emperor to scale down on his extravagant palace building projects. Later, he was promoted to Inspector of Jing Province.

In 237, Guanqiu Jian led an army to Liaodong to attack the warlord Gongsun Yuan, who was previously a vassal of the Cao Wei state but decided to rebel against Wei rule. However, the campaign had to be aborted due to heavy flooding. In the following year, Guanqiu Jian and Sima Yi led another campaign against Gongsun Yuan, defeated him, and restored stability in Liaodong. In recognition of his efforts during the campaign, Cao Rui promoted Guanqiu Jian from a district marquis to a county marquis under the title "Marquis of Anyi".

In 244, Guanqiu Jian led a punitive expedition to Goguryeo, leading to the Goguryeo–Wei Wars. He defeated the Goguryeo army led by King Dongcheon near the Tongjia River and then captured the Goguryeo capital Hwando. During the follow-up campaign in the next year, he conquered Hwando again and forced King Dongcheon to flee southeast. A subsection of the army reached the eastern coast of the peninsula and another reached northern Manchuria, but soon retreated. A stone carving was created to commemorate Guanqiu Jian's victory in the campaign. In 1905, a fragment of the monument was discovered. It is called the Stele of Guanqiu Jian's Inscribed Achievements.

In 255, Guanqiu Jian and Wen Qin started a rebellion in Shouchun (壽春; around present-day Shou County, Anhui) against the Wei regent Sima Shi, who came to power in 251 and monopolised state power, effectively rendering the Wei emperor a puppet ruler. Some historians argue that Guanqiu Jian rebelled because he remained loyal to the Wei emperor, Cao Mao, and was displeased that the Sima family was controlling the Wei government behind the scenes. Other sources state that he was close to Xiahou Xuan, who was purged by Sima Shi in 254 around the time Sima Shi deposed the third Wei emperor Cao Fang and replaced him with Cao Mao; Guanqiu Jian, fearing that he would end up like Xiahou Xuan, decided to rebel against Sima Shi. The rebellion was effectively suppressed within months and Guanqiu Jian was slain by one Zhang Shu after escaping from Shouchun to Shen County (慎縣; present-day Feidong County, Anhui). Most of Guanqiu Jian's family members were killed while the surviving ones escaped and defected to Wei's rival state, Eastern Wu.

Name
Guanqiu Jian's name is often read as Wuqiu Jian, and appears as such in Volume 73 of Sima Guang's Zizhi Tongjian. However, Wu Jinhua argued that the original reading was Muqiu (母丘; also alternatively written as Wuqiu 毋丘 and Manqiu 曼丘), and that Guanqiu was a later transcription error dating back to the Tang and Song dynasties. He supports his argument with the occurrence of Muqiu as a family name on a tomb stele from the Three Kingdoms period and also in the Ri Zhi Lu by early Qing dynasty scholar Gu Yanwu; as well as the occurrence of Wuqiu as a surname on an ancient seal and a bamboo strip from the Yinwan Han-period tomb excavated in 1993. Wu also points out that a general named Manqiu Chen is mentioned in the second part of Emperor Gao's biography in the Book of Han, and that an annotation by the Tang dynasty historian Yan Shigu mentions that "Manqiu and Muqiu were originally the same family name".

See also
 Lists of people of the Three Kingdoms

Notes

References

Sources
 Chen, Shou (3rd century). Records of the Three Kingdoms (Sanguozhi).
 Pei, Songzhi (5th century). Annotations to Records of the Three Kingdoms (Sanguozhi zhu).
 Wu, Jinhua (2001). "Sanguo Zhi Jiaoyi Xuli". Wenshi.

Year of birth unknown
255 deaths
Cao Wei generals
Cao Wei politicians
Political office-holders in Anhui
Political office-holders in Beijing
Three Kingdoms people killed in battle
Three Rebellions in Shouchun